Dewald Maritz (born ) is a South African rugby union player for the  in the Currie Cup. His regular position is prop.

He joined the  ahead of the newly formed Super Rugby Unlocked competition in October 2020.

References

South African rugby union players
Living people
1998 births
Rugby union props
Pumas (Currie Cup) players
Blue Bulls players